Semajno de Kulturo Internacia (SKI) is a week-long happening organised without a fixed schedule by the Italian Esperanto Youth (helped by the World Esperanto Youth Organization) in various cities of Italy, in association with the local town councils. It was born in 2008, as an initiative of the Italian Esperantist Brunetto Casini.

The core of the program consists of meetings between young Esperantists from all over the world, who are taken care for by the Italian Esperanto Youth and are hosted by the local authorities, and local students from primary and high schools. Several cultural activities are also organised, such as concerts (during the first edition there were concerts by the Esperanto-musicians Gianfranco Molle and Piero Nissim), theatral performances (Mario Migliucci played his performance Doktoro Esperanto), conferences for the citizens, cooking of typical dishes, and so on.

Past editions 
The first edition was held in San Giuliano Terme and the surroundings towns, in the province of Pisa, from 18  to 15 September 2008.

The second edition is going to be held in Terranuova Bracciolini, in the province of Arezzo, again in Tuscany. The date has not been fixed yet.

References

External links
 Official website by the Italian Esperanto Youth about SKI 
 Al via la prima settimana di cultura internazionale 
 http://www.eventiesagre.it/Eventi_Culturali/21621_Settimana+di+Cultura+Internazionale.html 
 http://iltirreno.repubblica.it/notizie-dal-web/dettaglio/Calci-(FI)---Settimana-di-Cultura-Internazionale/37794417?edition=Elba 

Esperanto meetings